Jebalbarez District is a district (bakhsh) in Jiroft County, Kerman Province, Iran. At the 2006 census, its population was 12,225, in 2,880 families.  The district has one city: Jebalbarez. The district has three rural districts (dehestan): Maskun Rural District, Rezvan Rural District, and Saghder Rural District.

References 

Jiroft County
Districts of Kerman Province